Sartaj Singh may refer to:

 Sartaj Singh (politician), an Indian politician
 Sartaj Singh (general), a Lieutenant General in the Indian Army
 Sartaj Singh, the protagonist of the 2018 TV series Sacred Games